Stephen A. Seche (born 1952) was the United States Ambassador to Yemen from 2007 to September 2010.

Biography
Stephen Seche was born in 1952. He received a B.A. in journalism from the University of Massachusetts Amherst in 1974. After working as a journalist for four years, he joined the Foreign Service in 1978. From 1978 to 1985, he was a diplomat in Guatemala, Peru and Bolivia. From 1989 to 1993, he served as Information Officer at the U.S. Embassy in Ottawa, Ontario, Canada. From 1993 to 1997, he served as Press Attache at the U.S. Embassy in New Delhi, India. He studied Arabic at the Foreign Service Institute's Field School in Tunis for two years.

From 1999 to 2002, Seche was Counselor for Public Affairs and Director of the American Cultural Center in Damascus, Syria. From 2002 to 2005, he served as Director of the Office for Egypt and Levant Affairs at the Department of State in Washington, D.C. From February 2005 to August 2006, he served as Chargé d'Affaires at the U.S. Embassy in Damascus. In 2006-2007, he taught at the University of Southern California as a visiting fellow. He became the United States Ambassador to Yemen on September 5, 2007, up until September 2010.
He was a research associate at the Institute for the Study of Diplomacy, Georgetown University. Seche served as the executive vice president of the Arab Gulf States Institute in Washington, DC from 2015 to 2020.

Seche speaks Arabic, English, French and Spanish.

References

Living people
1952 births
University of Massachusetts Amherst College of Social and Behavioral Sciences alumni
University of Southern California faculty
Ambassadors of the United States to Yemen
Ambassadors of the United States to Syria
United States Department of State officials
United States Foreign Service personnel